Mothercare plc is a British retailer which specialises in products for expectant mothers and in general merchandise for children up to eight years of age. It is listed on the London Stock Exchange and is a constituent of the FTSE SmallCap Index.

Mothercare's United Kingdom subsidiary had over 150 stores in 2017, but by 2019 the number had been reduced to 79. In November 2019, the subsidiary was placed into administration, which led to closure of all the stores. Mothercare-branded products continue to be sold by Boots and the parent company continues to supply franchisees in other countries.

History
The company was founded by Selim Zilkha and Sir James Goldsmith in 1961. It was first listed on the London Stock Exchange in 1972.

In 1982, the company merged with Habitat to form Habitat Mothercare plc. In 1986, Habitat Mothercare plc merged with British Home Stores, to form Storehouse plc. In January 1996, it bought Children's World from Boots, and rebranded these stores as Mothercare World. In May 2000, the Bhs stores were sold to Philip Green, and Storehouse reverted to the Mothercare brand.

In June 2007, Mothercare bought Early Learning Centre (ELC) for £85 million. In October 2007, it launched Gurgle, a pregnancy and parenting social networking website. In November 2009, Mothercare acquired the 50% of Gurgle that it did not already own.

In July 2010, Mothercare bought the trademark and brand of Blooming Marvellous, a privately owned rival. In May 2011, it was reported that the company would undergo a major restructure in its retail operations, resulting in an undisclosed number of ELC stores moving into neighbouring Mothercare stores to lower costs.

In May 2018, it was confirmed that Mothercare would close 50 stores in the United Kingdom under company voluntary arrangement schemes affecting three subsidiaries: Mothercare UK Limited, Early Learning Centre Limited and Childrens World Limited. The Early Learning Centre business – which operated in 80 UK stores and 400 overseas franchises – was sold to the Entertainer group in March 2019.

During the 2019 financial year, the company's Watford headquarters was sold in a leaseback transaction which raised £14.5M. In July 2019, the company said it was planning to spin off its UK retail business due to decreased sales. The company reported that UK store sales fell down by 23.2%, while online sales in the UK were down by 12.1%. The company recorded a worldwide sales drop of 9.4%.

In November 2019, the company put Mothercare UK (and Mothercare Business Services) into administration. This meant all the UK shops and the UK website closed soon after. Mothercare International still trades profitably.

Operations
The company operated online, on high streets and in out-of-town retail parks. In November 2009 it had over 1,060 stores worldwide, of which 389 were in the United Kingdom, and 671 were in 38 other countries.

By 2017, Mothercare operated over 1,302 stores worldwide, with 152 stores in the United Kingdom. In January 2019, Mothercare announced that its store closure programme was ahead of schedule and the group was on course to have 79 shops by the end of March 2019.

Following the closure of the UK business, from mid-2020 some Mothercare-branded products were to be sold by Boots, both online and in stores.

Financials
In September 2014, Mothercare made a nine-for-ten rights issue at 125p per share, a discount of 34.2 per cent to the then current share price, in order to raise £95m net of expenses, to be used to pay off £40 million in loans. By March 2018, Mothercare were in talks with the banks to waive their covenants, causing the company's share price to fall by one third to 22 pence per share. Mothercare has a pension shortfall of £80m.

UK administration
On 4 November 2019, Mothercare announced it was appointing administrators for its UK operations of 79 stores, placing 2,500 jobs at risk. The company, which suffered a loss of £36.3m during 2018–19, stated the decision came after a review made clear that the business would not return to profitability. On 5 November, it was announced by the administrators that there would be a phased closure of all UK stores and its headquarters.

Internationally

Ukraine
In Ukraine, the Mothercare brand is represented by MBGroup LLC. Ukrainian Mothercare stores are the same as their counterparts in the UK, with British representatives carefully monitoring the quality of the stores and their staff. The flagship store was opened in August 2004, in Kyiv's premier shopping mall, Globus; it is the largest Mothercare store in Ukraine, both in terms of size and range of products. After rapid expansion, the Mothercare brand is represented in Ukraine by over twenty stores in Kyiv, and several additional stores in Lviv, Dnipropetrovsk, Kharkiv, Odessa, Donetsk, Vinnytsia and Zaporizhya.

Kuwait
In 1983, M.H. Alshaya Co. began its first franchise operation with the Mothercare brand in Kuwait, which was also its first international store. Alshaya operates Mothercare franchises in the Middle East, North Africa, central and eastern Europe and Russia.

Singapore, Malaysia and Hong Kong
In Singapore, the Mothercare brand is represented by Kim Hin International Pte. Ltd. which began in 1984 by its founder and current chairman, Pang Kim Hin. Subsequently, the company expanded to include their Malaysian subsidiary Kim Hin Joo (Malaysia) Sdn. Bhd. in 1987 and Mother and Child Limited Hong Kong in 1992. The flagship store for Mothercare Malaysia is located at Suria KLCC.

Brunei Darussalam
In Brunei, Mothercare is owned by the Growtech Marketing Group, and has been operating since 1996. There are currently three stores in Brunei, two situated at the Brunei-Muara District and one at the Kuala Belait District. Mothercare Brunei's flagship store is located at Kiulap.

Indonesia 
In 2005, Mothercare opened its first store in Jakarta. The Mothercare brand, alongside Early Learning Centre and The Entertainer is represented by Kanmo Group.

References

External links
 

Retail companies of the United Kingdom
Retail companies established in 1961
Companies based in Watford
British companies established in 1961
Companies that have entered administration in the United Kingdom
Companies listed on the London Stock Exchange